Everett Transit is the public transit authority of Everett, Washington, the only city in Snohomish County not to belong to Community Transit. As of 2017, Everett Transit operates 42 buses within Everett on ten routes. Its annual ridership in 2016 was about 2 million.

Everett Transit became a department of the City of Everett in 1969, though it traces its roots back to the first public transit service to operate in the city, Everett City Lines, which began in 1893. The system has several hubs, including Everett Station, Everett Community College, Seaway Transit Center, and Everett Mall Station.

A budget crisis in the late 2010s had led to discussions about merging the system with Community Transit.

Route list

References

External links

Bus transportation in Washington (state)
Everett, Washington
Transportation in Snohomish County, Washington